Iqbal Ahmed Aamer (born 2 June 1973 in Karachi; generally known as Aamer Iqbal) is a Pakistani former first-class cricketer active 1991–2007 who played mainly for Karachi Blues. He represented his country at under-19 level. Aamer Iqbal was a right-handed batsman and a wicket-keeper. He scored 2,869 career runs with a highest score of 129, one of two centuries. He held 155 catches in his 71 first-class appearances and completed ten stumpings.

References

1973 births
Living people
Pakistani cricketers
Karachi Blues cricketers
Karachi Whites cricketers
Defence Housing Authority cricketers
Hyderabad (Pakistan) cricketers
Pakistan Customs cricketers